Lufeng (Chuxiong Yi script: , IPA：) is a county-level city located in Yunnan province, China, administered as a part of Chuxiong Yi Autonomous Prefecture.

Administrative divisions
Lufeng County has 11 towns and 3 townships. 
11 towns

3 townships
 Zhongcun
 Gaofeng
 Tuo'an

Ethnic groups
The Lufeng County Gazetteer (1997:114) lists the following ethnic Yi subgroups.

Luoluopu 倮罗濮 (exonym: Black Yi 黑彝): in Luochuan 罗川, Chuanjie 川街, Jinshan 金山, Zhongcun Jila 中村叽拉, Jiuzhuang Xinmin 旧庄新民, Qinfeng Yangxichong 勤丰洋溪冲
Xiaohechong Yi subgroup 小河冲彝族 (autonym: Luoluo 罗罗)
Nasupu 纳苏濮 (exonym: Red Yi 红彝, Luowu 罗武): in Zhongcun Ale 中村阿勒, Eshan 峨山, Shanqian 山前; Shezi Nadun 舍资纳甸, Qizai 杞栽, Mabaoshao 马保哨, Sanjia 三家
Gaisipu 改斯濮 (exonym: White Yi 白彝): in Gaofeng 髙峰, Tuo'an 妥安, Heijing 黑井, Guangtong 广通, etc.
Michapu 米切濮 (exonym: Micha 密岔族)

Climate

References

External links
Lufeng County Official Website
Lufeng County Agriculture Portal

County-level divisions of Chuxiong Prefecture
Cities in Yunnan